Beni Khedache is a town and commune in Médenine Governorate, Tunisia. It had a population of 3,071 as of 2004. It is home to a subterranean mosque.

Notable people
Boubaker El Akhzouri (1948-), theologian and politician

See also
List of cities in Tunisia

References

Populated places in Tunisia
Communes of Tunisia
Medenine Governorate